Bungin Tambun I is a village in district Padang Guci Hulu, in Kaur Regency in Bengkulu province and is one of the three villages in the district with the name "Bungin Tambun". Its population is 1068.

Climate
Bungin Tambun I has a cold subtropical highland climate (Cfb) with heavy rainfall year-round.

References

Villages in Bengkulu